Fritz Gallati (24 March 1935 – 25 October 2020) was a Swiss racing cyclist. He rode in the 1961 Tour de France.

References

External links
 

1935 births
2020 deaths
Swiss male cyclists
Place of birth missing